Jennifer Whyte is Director of the John Grill Institute for Project Leadership and Head of School of Project Management at the University of Sydney, Australia. Her focus is on working with industry, policy and government to improve the way projects are conceived, set-up, delivered and add value. She had led research on systems integration, construction transformation, and project analytics.

She retains a role as a Professor in the Department of Civil and Environmental Engineering at Imperial College London. where she was Director of the Centre for Systems Engineering and Innovation, which aims to bring systems engineering and innovation to built infrastructure. Her research interests are in the digital design and delivery of major infrastructure projects. She is a Fellow of the Institution of Civil Engineers and held the Laing O'Rourke and Royal Academy of Engineering chair in Systems Integration (2015-2021).

Education 
Whyte has a BA from Cambridge in 1994, and completed her PhD at Loughborough University in 2000.

Research and career 

Professor Whyte is Head of School of Project Management and Director of the John Grill Institute of Project Leadership at the University of Sydney. She joined University of Sydney in 2021 and retains a fractional appointment as a Professor at Imperial College London. 

She was previously a Co-Director of the Centre for Systems Engineering and Innovation at Imperial College London. Whyte joined the Department of Civil Engineering at Imperial College London in 2016 to lead the Centre for Systems Engineering and Innovation, which is developing the next generation of systems engineering tools and methods for infrastructure. She was previously at the University of Reading joining in 2007, and in 2010, founded a Design Innovation Research Centre, with £1.25m funding by the Engineering and Physical Sciences Research Council. She held an Advanced Institute of Management Fellowship. Previously she was a Senior Research Fellow in Imperial College Business School, working with Professor David Gann from 2003-2007. Before that she worked with the same team at SPRU, University of Sussex, from 2000-2003 on research projects including work on design quality indicators.

She is a member of Construction Leadership Council and sits on the UK's Industrial Strategy Challenge Fund 'Transforming Construction' advisory board, leads a strategic theme in the Alan Turing Institute/Lloyds Register Foundation's 'Data Centric Engineering Programme', and in 2018 gave evidence to the Lords Select Committee on Science and Technology on offsite manufacturing for construction. She co-curated the World Economic Forum (WEF) 'Engineering and Construction' transformation map. She sits on the Institution of Civil Engineers' Digital Transformation Panel. She was previously a member of the Royal Institute of British Architects (RIBA) Research and Innovation Group.

Publications
Whyte has written more than 40 journal papers, publishing in journals including Research Policy, International Journal of Project Management, Organization Studies, Design Studies, and Automation in Construction. In 2018, she published Virtual Reality and the Built Environment (second edition) with Dragana Nikolić.

Selected articles

References 

British women engineers
British civil engineers
Alumni of the University of Cambridge
Alumni of Loughborough University
Academics of Imperial College London
Fellows of the Institution of Civil Engineers
Living people
Year of birth missing (living people)
21st-century British engineers
21st-century women engineers